WMMI (830 AM) is a radio station located in Shepherd, Michigan. It airs a classic country format branded as "Buck 92".

History

Beginnings
The groundwork for WMMI was first laid in July 1982, when the construction permit to build it was first granted.  However, the station, owned originally by Great Lakes Radio Corporation, a company headed by Gary Randall, would not go on the air until almost five years later.  Studios, offices and transmitter facilities were located at 4865 East Wing Road in Mount Pleasant.  The station first went on the air as an affiliate of the Satellite Music Network, using its "Pure Gold" classic hits format, for music and disc jockeys, with some local announcers producing news and sports and commercials on site.  The station also broadcast in stereo during these early years.

WCZY Signs On
In August 1988, Central Michigan Communications, a company headed by Mike Carey, purchased WMMI, pairing it with a construction permit they had acquired to build an FM station. That station, known as WCZY, went on the air on August 20, 1991.

Sale to Latitude Media
After more than 25 years of ownership, Central Michigan Communications in 2013 sold WMMI and WCZY to its current owner, Latitude Media, for $779,000.

Buck 92
On January 4, 2021, WMMI changed its format from talk to classic country, branded as "Buck 92".

Programming
WMMI previously specialized primarily in political and news programming, airing many of the biggest names in AM talk such as Rush Limbaugh, Herman Cain and more.

In addition, WMMI previously offered Michigan-focused news and talk every weekday with Michigan's Morning Show with Michael Patrick Shiels from 6A-9A.

On the weekends, WMMI airs an assortment of special-topic programs on a variety of interests, from cars to baseball to technology.

The station broadcasts during daytime hours only, to protect Class-A clear-channel station WCCO in Minneapolis at night.

Previous logo

References

Michiguide.com - WMMI History
Broadcasting & Cable Yearbook - 1990
Broadcasting & Cable Yearbook - 1995
Broadcasting & Cable Yearbook - 2000
Broadcasting & Cable Yearbook - 2005
Broadcasting & Cable Yearbook - 2010
FCC Application to sell WMMI and WCZY to Latitude Media

External links

MMI
Radio stations established in 1987
1987 establishments in Michigan
MMI
Classic country radio stations in the United States